Ronald H. Strahle (December 16, 1921 – October 29, 1993) was an American politician who served in the Colorado House of Representatives from 1967 to 1987. He served as Speaker of the Colorado House of Representatives from 1977 to 1979.

References

1921 births
1993 deaths
Speakers of the Colorado House of Representatives
Republican Party members of the Colorado House of Representatives
20th-century American politicians